Suturoglypta blignautae is a species of sea snail, a marine gastropod mollusk in the family Columbellidae, the dove snails.

Description
Its shell size is 11.2 mm

Distribution
This species can be found along South Africa.

References

Columbellidae
Gastropods described in 1998
Invertebrates of South Africa